Mihkel Müller (21 October 1887 – 19 December 1970) was an Estonian wrestler. He competed in the Greco-Roman middleweight event at the 1920 Summer Olympics.

References

External links
 

1887 births
1970 deaths
People from Lääneranna Parish
People from the Governorate of Estonia
Estonian male sport wrestlers
Olympic wrestlers of Estonia
Wrestlers at the 1920 Summer Olympics
Estonian emigrants to Finland